Viškovo is a municipality in the Primorje-Gorski Kotar County in western Croatia. There are 14,445 inhabitants, with 85% Croats.

References

Municipalities of Croatia
Populated places in Primorje-Gorski Kotar County